Sete Vidas (Literally English: Seven Lives, International title: Parts of Me) is a Brazilian telenovela produced and broadcast by TV Globo from March 9 to July 10, 2015 replacing Boogie Oogie.

It was created by Lícia Manzo and starred by Domingos Montagner, Debora Bloch, Vanessa Gerbelli, Jayme Matarazzo, Isabelle Drummond, Maria Flor, Regina Duarte and Thiago Rodrigues.

Plot 
Miguel (Domingos Montagner) is a photographer traumatized with life, which is why he lives in exile in the middle of nowhere, on an expedition in Antarctica. In the past, he made an anonymous donation to a sperm bank, which resulted in seven children by different mothers. At one point, the seven children discover their father's identity and begin a clandestine search for him. Everyone knows each other through lanes on the Internet, and they take flight to the place where Miguel is. The seven children go through various hassles to reach the parent, how to survive the sinking of a vessel, commanded by one of them who is Argentine and lives in El Calafate, on the border between Argentina and  Chile.

At the same time, Julia (Isabelle Drummond), young generated via artificial insemination, registration number of the possession of their anonymous donor, discovers, through a specialized site, that she has a half-brother, Pedro (Jayme Matarazzo). The two make an appointment which, through a series of circumstances, ends up frustrating. On the way home, they inadvertently bump into each other at random, not knowing who the other is. The brief confusion, resulting in mutual attraction, makes them initiate a life marked by the weight of impossible love.

Its contribution has allowed some women to realize their dream of having children through IVF treatment. After being rescued, he will live a love triangle with Ligia (Débora Bloch) and Marina (Vanessa Gerbelli). The seven lives, that is, the seven children conceived through insemination, end up discovering the identity of Michael and know each other over the Internet through lanes. Together they organized a clandestine and dangerous search for her father, who survives a shipwreck.

The desired interaction between the six new stepbrothers, however, will soon be shaken: unable to control the feelings that nourish one another, Pedro and Julia end up giving a kiss that will separate them. Deeply guilty, come to the conclusion that should no longer live.

Cast

Ratings

References

External links 
  
 

2015 telenovelas
Brazilian telenovelas
TV Globo telenovelas
2015 Brazilian television series debuts
2015 Brazilian television series endings
Brazilian LGBT-related television shows
Portuguese-language telenovelas